Christina Meier may refer to:
 Christina Meier (hostage), German hostage in Afghanistan
 Mother of Megan Meier and figure in the Suicide of Megan Meier
Christina Meier (alpine skier)